Black Out is a psychological thriller by bestselling author Lisa Unger. It is a standalone novel.

Awards and honors
Black Out was selected as a Today show "Top 10" Summer Read, a BookSense Notable, won the Silver Medal for popular fiction in the 2008 Florida Book Awards and was a finalist in the 2009 Prix Polar International award.

References

2008 American novels
American crime novels
Novels by Lisa Unger
Shaye Areheart Books books